Bosden Farm is a suburban housing estate with a population of around 3,000 on the edge of Offerton, bordering Marple and Hazel Grove, in Stockport, England, surrounded by land used for agricultural purposes.

History
Under the name of Bosden, Bosden Farm formed first a township and then, from 1866 to 1900, a civil parish in Cheshire.

Bosden was one of the eight civil parishes of Cheshire to be included in the Stockport rural sanitary district in 1875. From 1894 it formed part of the Stockport Rural District. In 1900 the parish was abolished and it instead became part of the Hazel Grove and Bramhall civil parish and urban district. Hazel Grove and Bramhall Urban District was abolished in 1974 and as Bosden Farm, the area has since formed part of the Metropolitan Borough of Stockport in Greater Manchester.

Schools 

As of 2004, there is only one primary school after the closure of St. Stephen's Church of England Primary School. This is Warren Wood Primary School which was built in 1981 just a few hundred metres away from the shopping precinct on Turnstone Road. It serves as an active part of the community, providing local education to the pupils in the area and also holding public events and gatherings in the main hall and grounds.

References

Areas of Stockport